The women's 44 kg powerlifting event at the 2008 Summer Paralympics was contested on 9 September at the Beihang University Gymnasium in Beijing, China.

As with all Paralympic powerlifting events, lifters competed in the bench press. Each athlete was allowed three attempts to bench press as much weight as possible. Athletes attempting to break a record were allowed a fourth attempt. For the attempt to be valid, the competitor must have lowered the weighted bar to her chest, held it motionless for a moment, then pressed the bar upwards until her arms were fully extended. If the competitor failed to meet these requirements or any other rule infraction was committed, the attempt was declared invalid by a team of three referees and the result struck from the record.

Results 

Key: NMR=No marks recorded; DNS=Did not start

References 

 

Women's 044 kg
Para